Brenda Stubbert (born 1959) is a Cape Breton fiddler and composer from Point Aconi, Nova Scotia, Canada.  She comes from a musical family, as her father, Robert, and uncle, Lauchie, were both well-known fiddlers.  Brenda began step dancing and playing the piano at age five, and started playing fiddle at age eight.

Stubbert has made six solo recordings, and has published two books of tunes containing both her own compositions and other popular tunes from the Cape Breton fiddle repertoire.  One of her best-known compositions is "Rannie MacLellan's Reel", which has been widely recorded by other musicians.  In 1976, Stubbert was one of the fiddlers chosen to play for the Queen's visit to Halifax. Her 2008 recording Endless Memories won the 2009 East Coast Music Award for Roots/Traditional Solo Recording of the Year.

The tune "Brenda Stubbert's Reel", written by Jerry Holland, was named for her. Ashley MacIsaac also does a song sharing her name.

Discography 
 Tamerack'er Down  (1987)
 House Sessions (1992)
 In Jig Time (1994)
 Some Tasty Tunes (1999)
 Music All Around (2003)
 Endless Memories (2008)

Books
 Brenda Stubbert's Collection of Fiddle Tunes
 Brenda Stubbert - The Second Collection

References 

http://thescope.ca/ecma/ecma2009/ecma-2009-winners-list

External links 
 Official web site

1959 births
Living people
Musicians from Nova Scotia
Cape Breton fiddlers
21st-century Canadian violinists and fiddlers
Canadian women violinists and fiddlers